Fayneese S. Miller is an American academic administrator serving as the 20th president of Hamline University since July 2015. Miller was previously a professor and dean of the college of education and social services at the University of Vermont. She was a professor of education at Brown University from 1985 to 2000.

Life 
Miller earned a B.A. in psychology from the Hampton University. She earned a M.S. and Ph.D. in experimental and social psychology from Texas Christian University. Miller completed post-doctoral research in applied social psychology at the Yale University.

Miller was a professor of education at Brown University from 1985 to 2000 where she served as the director for the center the study of race and ethnicity in America. She was the founding chairperson of ethic studies. Miller was dean of the college of education and social services and a professor of leadership and developmental sciences at the University of Vermont.

On July 1, 2015, Miller became the 20th president of Hamline University. She is the first African-American and second woman in the position. Miller received widespread criticism of her handling of a campus controversy regarding the display of images of the Prophet Muhammad in an art history class. At a meeting on January 23, 2023, the university's faculty voted, 71–12, in favor of a statement requesting her resignation.

References

Hamline University faculty
Heads of universities and colleges in the United States
Living people
Year of birth missing (living people)
Women heads of universities and colleges
African-American women academic administrators
Texas Christian University alumni
Hampton University alumni
Brown University faculty
University of Vermont faculty
Women deans (academic)
21st-century African-American women
20th-century African-American women